The Communauté de communes Le Grésivaudan is a communauté de communes in the Isère département and in the Auvergne-Rhône-Alpes région of France. It was formed on 1 January 2009 by the merger of several former communautés de communes. Its seat is in Crolles. Its area is 676.7 km2, and its population was 101,729 in 2018.

Communes
The Communauté de communes consists of the following 43 communes:
 
Les Adrets
Allevard
Barraux
Bernin
Biviers
La Buissière
Chamrousse
Chapareillan
Le Champ-près-Froges
La Chapelle-du-Bard
Le Cheylas
La Combe-de-Lancey
Crêts-en-Belledonne
Crolles
La Flachère
Froges
Goncelin
Le Haut-Bréda
Hurtières
Laval-en-Belledonne
Lumbin
Montbonnot-Saint-Martin
Le Moutaret
La Pierre
Plateau-des-Petites-Roches
Pontcharra
Revel
Sainte-Agnès
Sainte-Marie-d'Alloix
Sainte-Marie-du-Mont
Saint-Ismier
Saint-Jean-le-Vieux
Saint-Martin-d'Uriage
Saint-Maximin
Saint-Mury-Monteymond
Saint-Nazaire-les-Eymes
Saint-Vincent-de-Mercuze
Tencin
La Terrasse
Theys
Le Touvet
Le Versoud
Villard-Bonnot

References 

Commune communities in France
Intercommunalities of Isère